Adult Contemporary is a chart published by Billboard ranking the top-performing songs in the United States in the adult contemporary music (AC) market.  In 1983, 18 songs topped the chart, based on playlists submitted by radio stations.

In the year's first issue of Billboard the number one song was "The Girl Is Mine" by Michael Jackson and Paul McCartney, which retained its position from the last chart of 1982.  It held the top spot for three weeks in 1983 before being displaced by "Baby, Come to Me" by Patti Austin and James Ingram.  The duet had originally been released the previous year and achieved little success.  It was re-released, however, after it was featured on the soap opera General Hospital, sparking renewed interest in the song which sent it to the top of both the AC chart and Billboards all-genre listing, the Hot 100.  Three other songs topped both listings in 1983, including Kenny Rogers and Dolly Parton's "Islands in the Stream", which was a triple chart-topper, also reaching number one on the Hot Country Singles chart.  In 2005 the song topped a poll run by country music television channel CMT of the best country duets of all time.

The most successful act on the AC chart in 1983 was Lionel Richie, who had three number ones and spent a total of fourteen weeks in the top spot.  He was the only act to have more than one chart-topper in 1983 and also claimed the longest-running number one of the year, spending six consecutive weeks atop the chart with "You Are".  No other act spent more than four weeks at number one in total during the year.  Richie, lead singer of the Commodores, had launched his solo career the previous year and quickly reached superstar status.  His song "All Night Long (All Night)" was another triple chart-topper, as it also reached number one on the Hot 100 and the Hot Black Singles listing.  The year's final AC number one was Barry Manilow's version of "Read 'Em and Weep", a song originally recorded by hard rock singer Meat Loaf.

Chart history

References

See also
1983 in music
List of artists who reached number one on the U.S. Adult Contemporary chart

1983
1983 record charts
1983 in American music